Tarara Day is held every year on 15 March in New Zealand. It is the day when Tarara—descendants of Croatian men who arrived in the 1890s to dig gum and of Māori women—celebrate their combined heritage.

References

Folk festivals in New Zealand
Cultural festivals in New Zealand
Autumn events in New Zealand
Māori festivals